Missoküla is a settlement in Rõuge Parish, Võru County in southeastern Estonia. Between 1991–2017 (until the administrative reform of Estonian municipalities) the village was the administrative centre of Misso Parish.

References

Villages in Võru County